The Song of Five Races Under One Union is a former national anthem of China. It was created in 1912 and used by the Provisional Government in Nanjing until the adoption of the Song to the Auspicious Cloud in 1913.

History
After the establishment of the provisional government in Nanjing, the Ministry of Education under Cai Yuanpei asked the public for possible anthems (as well as coats of arms), and "Song of Five Races under One Union", with lyrics by Shen Enfu (沈恩孚) and music by Shen Pengnian (沈彭年), was released as a draft in the newspaper.

Lyrics

References 

Historical national anthems